The Burnt River is a river which flows from its source at Miskwabi Lake in Highlands East, Haliburton County south into the Kawartha Lakes region. It empties into Cameron Lake in the city of Kawartha Lakes, part of the Trent–Severn Waterway. The town of Burnt River is located near its southern end.

The river was used to transport lumber to sawmills downstream. Later, the Victoria Railway was built along the river. The old railway bed is now a recreational trail.

The river was given its name after a forest fire in the region left the river's water with an unusual colour.

Fish species

There are three major species of fish in the river including walleye, muskie and smallmouth bass. All three tend to grow smaller than those in the nearby lakes, however they may be legally caught according to local regulations. As well as conventional fishing techniques, the smallmouth bass may be caught while fly fishing.

Tributaries
Drag River
Irondale River

See also
List of rivers of Ontario

References

Sources

Rivers of Kawartha Lakes
Rivers of Haliburton County